Steaua București (Basketball) is the basketball section of CSA Steaua București sport club, based in Bucharest, Romania. The club competes in Liga Națională, the top tier of Romanian basketball.

Being part of one of Romania's biggest sports clubs, famous especially for its football team, Steaua's basketball club enjoyed plenty of success over the years, but also disappointments. Many of the last few years have been spent in the second division, including the previous season. In 2013, the team merged with CSM Bucharest and became .

History
After the Romanian Revolution, Baschet Club Steaua București was the first basketball club in Romania to turn private. However, after only a few years it went bankrupt, and CSA Steaua operated only a youth club for basketball, under the name of Clubul Sportiv Școlar Steaua București.

In 2008, Steaua merged with BC Târgoviște and played again in the first division, under the name BC Steaua București. Turning on the new page in club's history, with Mladen Jojic as head coach, Steaua decided to compete in Divizia B with young team and mostly Romanian players, with the average age of 21.

The team eventually returned to the highest level in Romania. In 2011, the team reached the Romanian Cup Final, which was the first time in a long time that the team played for a trophy.

In 2013, the team merged with CSM Bucharest and a new team name was found in CSM Steaua Bucharest.

In the 2015–16 season, the newly formed team would make its debut in Europe through the Eurocup.

Fans
Steaua Bucuresti sports sections are famous by large fans database. With the biggest crown size in Romania, mostly dedicated to football and basketball club.

Currently Steaua's supporters are not led by a single group. The tendency nowadays is to form several small groups who play their own part. The most important part of them are located in the Peluza Nord (North End), some others taking their place in the Peluza Sud (South End). Because of different attitudes towards the team and the game (PS are usually tougher and more severe in which regards the game and often not so patient), there have lately been quite a few conflicts between the two. The groups at the PS (Ultras, Glas, Vacarm, Stil Ostil, Banda Ultra, Era, Outlaws, Hunters, South Boys) even officially ceased activity for a while because of conflicts like these with the more numerous PN. Groups inside Peluza Nord include Tineretului Korp, Titan Boys, Nucleo, Gruppo Tei, Skins Berceni, Insurgenții, Armata 47, Ultras Colentina, Gruppo Voluntari Est, Roosters.

It is rather difficult to assign Steaua fans a certain style. They are described by the typical Italian style, common in different respects to all Romanian groups of fans, with many choreographies, banners, flags, doubleholders and flags swinging in the air.

Achievements
Romanian Championship
Winners: (21): 1956, 1958, 1959, 1960, 1961, 1962, 1963, 1964, 1966, 1967, 1978, 1980, 1981, 1982, 1984, 1985, 1986, 1987, 1989, 1990, 1991
Euroleague
Third place (1): 1961

Season by season

Current roster

Notable players

Ronnie Harrell (born 1996)

Head coaches

Arenas
Steaua București plays its home national domestic league games at the 2,000-seat Sala Mihai Viteazul. They play their home European league games at the 5,300 seat Sala Polivalentă.

References

External links
 Official CSA Steaua website
 Club website
FIBA Europe Cup 2017 profile
Eurobasket.com CSA Steaua Page

1952 establishments in Romania
Basketball teams established in 1952
basketball
Basketball teams in Romania